The field hockey tournament at the 1975 Pan American Games was the third edition of the field hockey event at the Pan American Games. It took place in Mexico City, Mexico from 14 to 25 October 1975.

The two-time defending champions Argentina won their third gold medal in a row by defeating Canada 1–0 in the final. The hosts Mexico won the bronze medal by defeating Jamaica 2–0.

Results

Round robin

Fifth to sixth place classification

Medal round

Semi-finals

Bronze medal match

Gold medal match

Final standings

References
 Pan American Games field hockey medalists on HickokSports

1975 Pan American Games
1975
1975 Pan American Games
Pan American Games